Sosnovoborsky (masculine), Sosnovoborskaya (feminine), or Sosnovoborskoye (neuter) may refer to:
Sosnovoborsky District, a district of Penza Oblast, Russia
Sosnovoborsky Municipal Formation with Urban Okrug Status, the administrative division which the town of Sosnovy Bor, Leningrad Oblast, Russia, is incorporated as
Sosnovoborsky Urban Okrug, the municipal formation corresponding to that administrative division
Sosnovoborskoye, a rural locality (a selo) in Saratov Oblast, Russia

See also
Sosnovoborsk
Sosnovy Bor